John Niemiec (March 21, 1901 – June 16, 1976) was an American football player and coach. He served as the head football coach at Columbia College—now known as Loras College—in Dubuque, Iowa from 1934 to 1937. Niemiec played college football at the University of Notre Dame from 1926 to 1928. He led the Fighting Irish in passing in 1927 and 1928. Niemiec also coached at Steubenville High School in Steubenville, Ohio and Bellaire High School in his home town of  Bellaire, Ohio. He died on June 16, 1976, at the age of 75.

Head coaching record

College

References

1901 births
1976 deaths
American football halfbacks
Loras Duhawks football coaches
Notre Dame Fighting Irish football players
High school football coaches in Ohio
People from Bellaire, Ohio
Coaches of American football from Ohio
Players of American football from Ohio